The Restarts are an English street punk band based in London.

The Restarts were formed in 1995 in London with Darragh O'Neill on drums, Kieran Plunkett from Armed and Hammered on bass guitar, and Mik Useless on the guitar. They played many shows in the UK as a trio until Useless left, at which point Alan Campbell joined the band. With Campbell on guitar, they recorded their album System Error LP, but due to his commitments to the UK Subs he had to leave. In April 2003 Robin Licker from the Short Bus Window Lickers joined the Restarts as their new guitarist. They toured extensively in Europe and US. They have played with bands like Born/Dead, Limp Wrist, The Accüsed, Strychnine, Dr. Know and Monster Squad.

Members
Kieran Plunkett - bass guitar/vocals
Robin Licker - guitar/vocals
Jeremy Hayat - drums

Former members
Mik Useless - guitar, vocals, artwork (1995–2002)
Darragh O'Neill  - drums (1995–2008)
Alan Campbell - guitars and backing vocals on System Error (2003)
Bram Provoost - drums/vocals (2008-2015)

Discography
 Jobclub demo (1996)
 Frustration EP (1996)
 Just Gets Worse EP (1997)
 State Rape split twelve inch with Zero Tolerance (1998)
 Your World split seven inch with Broken (1999)
 Legacy of Bigotry split seven inch with Left for Dead (2000)
 State Rape split CD with Fleas and Lice (2002)
 Slumworld CD/LP (2002)
 Actively Seeking Work compilation CD (2003)
 System Error CD/LP (2003)
 Outsider CD (2007)
 Mobocracy split CD with Millions of Dead Cops (2009)
 A Sickness of the Mind CD (2013)
 "Uprising" LP, CD (2019)

References

External links
The Restarts Home Page
The Restarts on Myspace
Kieran Plunkett's art

English punk rock groups
Third-wave ska groups
English ska musical groups
Ska punk musical groups
Musical groups from London